Natasha Shirazi (born 8 February 1996) is a Ugandan footballer with Danish citizenship, who plays as a forward for Turkish the Istanbul-based club Beşiktaş J.K. and for the Uganda national team.

Club career 
Shirazi has played for BSF, B.93, and Nordsjælland in Denmark, for Rayo Vallecano and La Solana in Spain and for Maccabi Kishronot Hadera in Israel.

In August 2022, she moved to Turkey and joined Beşiktaş J.K. in Istanbul to play in the 2022-23 Super League.

International career 
Shirazi played for Uganda at senior level on 3 July 2016 in a 0–4 friendly away loss to Kenya.

Personal life 
Shirazi also holds Danish citizenship.

References

External links 
Natasha Shirazi at BDFútbol

1996 births
Living people
Ugandan women's footballers
Women's association football forwards
Rayo Vallecano Femenino players
Maccabi Kishronot Hadera F.C. players
Ligat Nashim players
Uganda women's international footballers
Ugandan expatriate women's footballers
Ugandan expatriate sportspeople in Spain
Expatriate women's footballers in Spain
Ugandan expatriate sportspeople in Israel
Expatriate women's footballers in Israel
Ugandan emigrants to Denmark
Naturalised citizens of Denmark
Danish women's footballers
Ballerup-Skovlunde Fodbold (women) players
Boldklubben af 1893 players
FC Nordsjælland (women) players
Elitedivisionen players
Danish expatriate women's footballers
Danish expatriate sportspeople in Spain
Danish expatriate sportspeople in Israel
Danish people of Ugandan descent
Expatriate women's footballers in Turkey
Danish expatriate sportspeople in Turkey
Turkish Women's Football Super League players
Beşiktaş J.K. women's football players

Uganda international footballers
Denmark international footballers
Ugandan footballers
Expatriate footballers in Turkey
Ugandan expatriate footballers
Association football forwards
Expatriate footballers in Israel